Renu Chadha is an Indian politician and member of the Bharatiya Janata Party. Chadha was a member of the Himachal Pradesh Legislative Assembly from the Banikhet constituency in Chamba district.

References 

Year of birth missing (living people)
Living people
People from Chamba district
Bharatiya Janata Party politicians from Himachal Pradesh
Himachal Pradesh MLAs 2007–2012
Women members of the Himachal Pradesh Legislative Assembly
21st-century Indian women politicians
21st-century Indian politicians